Kyle Benedictus (born 7 December 1991) is a Scottish footballer who plays as a centre back for Scottish League One side Dunfermline Athletic.

He started his career with Lincraig Boys Club before moving to Dundee, and had loan spells at Montrose in 2011 and Alloa Athletic in the 2014–15 season. He would then have a lengthy stint with Raith Rovers, during which he would captain the side.

Career
Dundee-born Benedictus made his début for Dundee on 1 November 2008 against Airdrie United at Dens Park, playing the full match. He later signed a contract extension after breaking into the first team.

On 28 January 2011 he joined Montrose on loan for a month.

On 1 September 2014, Benedictus signed for Scottish Championship club Alloa Athletic on a season-long loan deal. At the end of the season Alloa finished second bottom of the 2014–15 Scottish Championship meaning they faced play-offs to avoid relegation. Having not scored all season Benedictus scored twice in the play-offs and Alloa survived.

On 10 June 2015, it was confirmed that Benedictus had signed for Raith Rovers. During his lengthy 7-year stint in Kirkcaldy, Benedictus would quickly be named the club captain in his first season, experience a shock relegation to the Scottish League One in 2017, see a return to the Championship after winning the League One title in 2020, lead a strong push to the Premiership play-offs the following season, and winning two Scottish Challenge Cup titles.

On 6 June 2022, Benedictus would sign a two-year deal with Raith's Fife rivals and Scottish League One side Dunfermline Athletic. Benedictus scored his first goal for the Pars from the penalty spot in September, against league rivals Falkirk.

Career statistics

Honours

Clubs 
Dundee
 Scottish Championship: 2013–14
 Scottish Challenge Cup: 2009–10
Raith Rovers
 Scottish League One: 2019–20
 Scottish Challenge Cup (2): 2019–20, 2021–22

Individual 
November 2008 – Young Player of the Month

References

External links

Living people
1991 births
Footballers from Dundee
Scottish footballers
Association football defenders
Scottish Football League players
Dundee F.C. players
Montrose F.C. players
Alloa Athletic F.C. players
Raith Rovers F.C. players
Scottish Premier League players
Scottish Professional Football League players
Dunfermline Athletic F.C. players